Kita Maninkakan, or Central Malinke, is a Manding language spoken by close to a million people in Mali, where it is a national language. About 10% are ethnically Fula.

The Kagoro variety is 86% lexically similar according to Ethnologue, and is being replaced by Bambara.

References

Manding languages
Languages of Mali